Cart with Red and White Ox is an oil painting created in 1884 by Vincent van Gogh. It is in the Kröller-Müller Museum in  Otterlo, Netherlands and may have been made either before or after Cart with Black Ox. Van Gogh painted both some four years before leaving the Netherlands for the South of France. A similar painting made the same year, called Cart with a Black Ox, is in the Portland Art Museum in Portland.

See also
 List of works by Vincent van Gogh

References

External links 
 

Paintings by Vincent van Gogh
1884 paintings
Cattle in art
Collections of the Kröller-Müller Museum